The Miami–Cincinnati Victory Bell is the trophy awarded to the winner of the American college football rivalry game played by the  Cincinnati Bearcats football team of the University of Cincinnati and the Miami RedHawks football team of Miami University.  The Victory Bell is the oldest current non-conference college football rivalry in the United States (though the teams were briefly conference rivals in the late 1940s and early 1950s).

Historical background

As part of the agreement for the Symmes Purchase, John Cleves Symmes was instructed by the federal government to reserve a township for the creation of a university. Initially, land had been set aside in Cincinnati, but after a revision of the purchase, Symmes erroneously believed the requirement for a university was no longer necessary so the original plot was sold to settlers. Finally, on March 3, 1803, two days after Ohio attained statehood, Congress granted one complete township to be located in the District of Cincinnati under direction of the Ohio Legislature; if no township within the Symmes Purchase were offered in five years, then a township from federal lands was granted the State of Ohio to be held in trust for the establishment of a college. No township was offered, since no unentered township remained between the two Miami rivers. Miami University was finally founded in 1809, although construction was halted for many years. Interest in higher education did not decline in Cincinnati, with the foundation of the Cincinnati College in 1819, which would later become part of the University of Cincinnati. Delays during the War of 1812 even saw residents of Cincinnati try—and fail—to move Miami to the city in 1822 and to divert its income to the foundation of another college in Cincinnati. 

Beyond this foundational rivalry, many early faculty would serve at both universities. Famously William Holmes McGuffey joined the faculty of Miami in 1826, and began his work on the McGuffey Readers while in Oxford. McGuffey resigned in 1836 and became the President of the Cincinnati College, where he urged parents not to send their children to Miami noting, "[Miami would be] where it was more likely they would be made into Drunkards and Gamblers than good Scholars."

Series history

The Bearcats and RedHawks square off each fall for the famed Victory Bell.  The first game in the series, played on December 8, 1888, in Oxford, Ohio, was the first college football game played in the state of Ohio.  The original bell hung in Miami's Harrison Hall (Old Main) near the site of the first game and was used to ring in Miami victories.  The traveling trophy tradition began in the 1890s when some Cincinnati fans "borrowed" the bell.  The bell went to the winner of the annual game for the next forty years until it mysteriously disappeared in the 1930s.  The original bell reappeared in 1946 and was on display in the lobby of Miami's Murstein Alumni Center for years.  The current trophy is a replica of the original bell and is kept in the possession of the winning team each year.  One side of the bell is painted black with white numbers showing Cincinnati's victories, while the other side is white with red numbers showing Miami's victories.  Ties are indicated on the top of the red yoke in white numbers.

Given the proximity of the schools and many enrollees and alumni from the Greater Cincinnati area, from 1909 to 1970 the game was exclusively played at Cincinnati's Nippert Stadium, rather than hosting in the more rural Oxford. From 1912 to 1960 the game took place over Thanksgiving Weekend, making the Victory Bell a featured part of Thanksgiving traditions for fans of both schools. Cincinnati students and fans alike would go on an annual "Pajama Parade" through downtown Cincinnati the night prior to each Victory Bell contest.

The Miami–Cincinnati series ranks fifth on the list of most-played rivalries in college football and is the oldest Division I rivalry west of the Allegheny Mountains.  After the 2010–2014 NCAA conference realignment led to the end of several historic rivalries, it is now the most-played currently active rivalry involving schools from the same state, and also holds the same distinction among inter-conference rivalries. Of the more than thirty college football rivalries that include at least 89 games, none is older than Miami vs. Cincinnati.

The two schools also have strong coaching histories, especially Miami's Cradle of Coaches. Four men have been head coaches at both schools: Amos Foster, George Little, Sid Gillman, and George Blackburn. 

Miami and Cincinnati extended the rivalry series through 2029, committing to preserving one of the oldest and longest played games in college football. The Victory Bell will be hosted at Paul Brown Stadium in 2018, 2022, and 2026 as a part of the renewed contract. However, due to the COVID-19 pandemic, the Mid-American Conference postponed fall sports in August 2020, canceling that year's edition of the Victory Bell game.

Notable games
November 23, 1923: The Bearcats would go on to beat Miami 23–0. The significance of this match-up would come a month later, when Cincinnati player James Gamble "Jimmy" Nippert on would die from blood poisoning, due to a spike wound sustained during the game. James N. Gamble of Procter & Gamble, donated the required funds to complete the stadium.  A locker room and training (medical) facility was added as part of the renovation for the safety of players.

November 25, 1950: In a clash of future coaching legends, Miami and Woody Hayes took on Cincinnati and former Miami head coach Sid Gillman for the MAC Championship title in the midst of a snowstorm. The Redskins ended up being too much for the Bearcats and would take the game 28–0 as well as the conference crown. Miami would go on to win the Salad Bowl against Arizona State 34–21. Additionally, this game took place on the same day as the Snow Bowl between Michigan and Ohio State. Ohio State's loss to Michigan led to the Buckeyes to hire Woody Hayes away from Miami.

November 23, 1968: Determined to hand Miami a loss, Cincinnati had a potent offense led by QB Greg Cook and WR/K Jim O'Brien. Climbing back from a 21–6 deficit, the Bearcats recovered an onside kick and completed one pass before O'Brien drilled a forty-seven-yard field goal with three seconds remaining in the fourth quarter. UC would win the bell 23–21. This was Bo Schembechler's last game before he left to coach at the University of Michigan. Cincinnati Bengals founder Paul Brown was in attendance and concluded to draft Cook based on his performance in the game.

September 27, 2003: The 3–0 Bearcats headed to Oxford to take on Ben Roethlisberger and the RedHawks. Miami jumped to a huge lead, with Roethlisberger passing for 377 yards. The Bearcats mounted a furious comeback, scoring three times in the final eight minutes, but Miami's lead was too much and they would win 42–37.

September 16, 2017: It was Homecoming at Miami, and the RedHawk faithful were hopeful they could finally end Cincinnati's then 11-game winning streak with the Bearcats now led by then first-year coach Luke Fickell. Miami was leading 17–6 with 4:45 left in the game, when the Bearcats mounted an unthinkable comeback, scoring 15 unanswered points in the final 2:52.  After a late Bearcats touchdown drive, Miami still held a 17-14 lead, and was poised to run out the clock.  With 1:13 remaining and UC holding only one timeout, the RedHawks attempted to convert a 3rd down & 7 that would effectively end the game, but MU QB Gus Ragland made an ill-advised throw into double coverage.  UC linebacker Malik Clements intercepted the pass and ran it into the end zone for a pick-six touchdown.  The Bearcats would hold on and escape, winning 21–17.

September 4, 2021: After the 2020 meeting between the two schools was cancelled the teams resumed their rivalry and for the first time in the series was each others first game of the season. The Bearcats picked up right where they left off and continued to win, Desmond Ridder hit Tyler Scott with an 81-yard bomb 45 seconds into the game, The Bearcats scored the first 42 points of the game and led all the way to a 49–14 win at Nippert Stadium.  The win extended UC's winning streak in the series to 15, and knotted the all-time series at 59–59–7.

Game results

Source

Wins by venue

See also  
 List of NCAA college football rivalry games
 List of most-played college football series in NCAA Division I

References

College football rivalry trophies in the United States
Miami RedHawks football
Cincinnati Bearcats football